Group E of the EuroBasket Women 2015 took place between 17 and 21 June 2015. The group played all of its games at Főnix Hall in Debrecen, Hungary.

The four best ranked teams advanced to the final round. The points against teams from the same preliminary round were taken over.

Qualified teams

Standings

All times are local (UTC+2).

17 June

Turkey vs Montenegro

Czech Republic vs Belarus

Greece vs France

19 June

Montenegro vs Belarus

Greece vs Czech Republic

France vs Turkey

21 June

Turkey vs Czech Republic

Montenegro vs Greece

Belarus vs France

External links
Official website

Group E
2014–15 in Turkish basketball
2014–15 in French basketball
2014–15 in Belarusian basketball
2014–15 in Montenegrin basketball
2014–15 in Greek basketball
2014–15 in Czech basketball